The Independence Avalon is a German single-place, paraglider that was designed by Michaël Nesler and produced by Independence Paragliding of Eisenberg, Thuringia. It is now out of production.

Design and development
The Avalon was designed as a beginner glider. The models are each named for their relative size.

Company test pilot Christian Amon was also involved in the development as well as flight testing of the Avalon.

Variants
Avalon S
Small-sized model for lighter pilots. The glider model is DHV 1 certified.
Avalon M
Mid-sized model for medium-weight pilots. The glider model is DHV 1 certified.
Avalon L
Large-sized model for heavier pilots. The glider model is DHV 1 certified.
Avalon XL
Extra large-sized model for much heavier pilots. The glider model is DHV 1 certified.

Specifications (Avalon L)

References

Avalon
Paragliders